Exterminator may refer to:

A practitioner in pest control

Competition
Exterminator (horse) (1915–1945), racehorse, the winner of the 1918 Kentucky Derby
X-Terminator, a competitor in Robot Wars

Fiction
 Exterminator!, a 1973 short story collection by William S. Burroughs
 The Exterminator (1960 book), short story collection by William S. Burroughs, see William S. Burroughs bibliography
 Billy the Exterminator, a reality series previously known as The Exterminators
 The Exterminators (Doctor Who audio), a Doctor Who audio drama
The Exterminator set in the Doctor Who – Battles in Time card game

Comics
 The Exterminators (comics), a Vertigo comic book series
 Exterminators (comics), a group consisting of Spider-Man enemies
 Exterminator (comics), a Marvel Comics supervillain better known as Death-Stalker

Film
 The Exterminator, a 1980 American vigilante action film starring Robert Ginty
 Exterminator 2 (1984 film), a sequel to the 1980 film
 ExTerminators, a 2009 movie starring Amber Heard, Heather Graham, and Jennifer Coolidge
 The Exterminators, a 1965 spy film

People
French buccaneer Daniel Montbars (born 1645), better known as Montbars the Exterminator

Other uses
Exterminator (roller coaster), an indoor roller coaster at Kennywood
XTRMNTR, an album by Primal Scream released in 2000

See also
Extermination (disambiguation)
Terminator (disambiguation)